Roxana Hartmann, née Luca (born 23 December 1982) is a Romanian former competitive figure skater. She is a ten-time Romanian national champion and represented her country at two Olympics. She qualified for the free skate at the 2002 Winter Olympics in Salt Lake City, four European Championships, and two World Junior Championships. Her best ISU Championship result was 15th, which she achieved at the 2002 Junior Worlds and 2005 Europeans.

Career 
Luca made her senior international debut when she was 13 years old, placing 14th in her qualifying group at the 1996 European Championships. She competed on both the junior and senior levels until the end of the 2001–02 season. Her best result in five appearances at the World Junior Championships was 15th in 2002.

Luca placed 23rd at the 2002 Winter Olympics in Salt Lake City, Utah, United States. She underwent knee surgery in September 2003 and missed the 2003–04 season as a result.

Luca finished a career-best 15th at the 2005 European Championships. A back injury caused her to withdraw from the 2006 European Championships during the short program. She placed 26th at her second Olympics, in Turin.

Luca last competed at the 2009 World Championships.

Now known as Roxana Hartmann, she works as a figure skating coach and choreographer in southern Germany.

Programs

Competitive highlights 
GP: Grand Prix; JGP: Junior Series/Junior Grand Prix

References

External links 

 

1982 births
Living people
Romanian emigrants to Germany
Romanian female single skaters
Figure skaters at the 2007 Winter Universiade
Sportspeople from Bucharest
Olympic figure skaters of Romania
Figure skaters at the 2006 Winter Olympics
Figure skaters at the 2002 Winter Olympics
Competitors at the 2005 Winter Universiade